Cabricán is a town and municipality in the Quetzaltenango department of Guatemala. The head town of Cabricán is situated at an altitude of 2,525 m above sea level.

Cabrican is the location of Roman Catholic radio station Radio Mam. The station primarily broadcasts in the Mam language.

References 

Municipalities of the Quetzaltenango Department